Ken McPherson (25 March 1927 – 5 February 2018) was an English professional footballer. A centre-forward, he began his career with Notts county in 1950 before moving on to Middlesbrough in 1957 and Coventry City in 1955.

In 1958 McPherson joined Newport County and went on to make 128 league appearances for the club, scoring 51 goals. He moved then moved to Swindon Town where he made 107 appearances between 1961 and 1965.

References

1927 births
2018 deaths
English footballers
Notts County F.C. players
Middlesbrough F.C. players
Coventry City F.C. players
Newport County A.F.C. players
Swindon Town F.C. players
English Football League players
Association football forwards
Footballers from Hartlepool